Fallen is a 2016 American romantic fantasy drama film directed by Scott Hicks, based on Lauren Kate’s 2009 novel of same name. The film stars Addison Timlin, Jeremy Irvine, Harrison Gilbertson, and Joely Richardson.

The film was released on November 10, 2016 in certain countries including Malaysia, Philippines and Singapore by Lotus Entertainment. It released to theaters in the United States on September 22, 2017, by Relativity Media.

Plot

Lucinda Luce Price is sent to Sword and Cross Academy for troubled young teens after she is blamed for the death of a boy named Trevor who perishes in a fire started by mysterious shadows that Luce sees after kissing him. Luce feels cursed, blaming herself for Trevor’s death.

Upon arriving at her new school, Luce meets various students, including Cameron “Cam” Briel, who has taken an interest in her; Arriane Alter, who takes Luce under her wing; Molly Zane, who harasses Luce; Pennyweather "Penn” Van Syckle-Lockwood, who befriends Luce; and Daniel Grigori, a brooding boy to whom Luce is instantly attracted. She also meets Miss Sophia, a religious studies teacher. During a session, the school psychiatrist tells Lucinda she can leave if she takes antipsychotics.

During detention, picking up trash, Luce is almost crushed by a falling statue of an avenging angel. Later, Cam flirts with Luce before inviting her to a party in the woods. At the party, Luce is attracted to Cam, but can not shake the feeling of a deep and unusual connection to Daniel, despite his attempts to brush her off. Molly shows up and proceeds to harass and almost kill Luce before Arriane intervenes. As Luce leaves, she sees the “shadows” again.

Luce overhears Miss Sophia telling Daniel that Cam may have been behind the angel statue almost falling on Luce. She expresses fear for Luce because she is unbaptized. The two realize that Luce is listening to them, and Daniel follows Luce outside. They walk together and he admits that during class he was working on a graphic novel. In the story a boy and a girl are in love with each other, but are cursed such that each time they kiss, the girl dies; she then reincarnates, meets the boy (who never ages or changes) 17 years later, and they fall in love and kiss again, only for the cycle to repeat endlessly every 17 years.

Cam takes Luce to a club on her birthday and they kiss, only to be violently interrupted by Daniel, who yells that he had told Cam to stay away from Luce, and accuses him of still being “with Lucifer.” Luce flees and tells Penn what happened, confiding that she suspects Cam and she have been reincarnated. Penn and her friend Todd sneak into the library with Luce and search the computer with a facial recognition tool; they discover a photo from 1854 of Daniel and Luce, and Luce again has a flash of memory, seeing herself and Daniel posing for the photo in 1854. As Penn leaves to retrieve the photo from the printer, Luce sees the "shadows" again. Another mysterious fire breaks out; it engulfs the library and kills Todd. Daniel rescues an unconscious Luce from the fire.

Later, Luce finds Daniel on a roof top, and he reveals that they are the boy and girl from his graphic novel story. Daniel further reveals that he is a fallen angel, which explains his immortality. The two kiss, but Cam appears, telling Luce that because she has not been baptised, Lucifer will come for her. He tries to convince Luce to pick him instead of Daniel, but Daniel whisks Luce away and takes her to Miss Sophia, leaving to fight Cam and stop Lucifer from coming for Luce.

As the two fight, Cam reveals that he was not the one behind Luce's murders; meanwhile, Miss Sophia kills Penn. Luce screams, which brings Daniel to her aid and he protects her from Miss Sophia, who is revealed to be the one actually trying to kill Luce. Miss Sophia justifies her murders by explaining that, with Luce gone, Daniel would have been forced to choose a side and order would have been restored. The shadows show up behind Miss Sophia as she is talking and consume her.

Daniel explains to a shaken Luce that her being unbaptized would make her next death permanent; Miss Sophia thought this would cause Daniel to choose Heaven. He tells her that Lucifer will indeed come for her, and that he must take her somewhere safe. They declare their love for each other as they leave to find safe haven from Lucifer.

Cast
 Addison Timlin as Lucinda "Luce" Price 
 Jeremy Irvine as Daniel Grigori
 Harrison Gilbertson as Cameron "Cam" Briel
 Daisy Head as Arriane Alter
 Lola Kirke as Pennyweather "Penn" Van Syckle-Lockwood
 Sianoa Smit-McPhee as Molly Zane
 Hermione Corfield as Gabrielle "Gabbe" Givens
 Malachi Kirby as Roland Sparks
 Joely Richardson as Sophia Bliss
 Juliet Aubrey as Doreen Price
 Paul Slack as Harry Price
 Leo Suter as Trevor Beckman
 Chris Ashby as Todd Hammond 
 Auguszta Tóth as Todd Hammond's Mother 
 David Schaal as Randy
 Norma Kuhling as Rachel
 Richard Ryan as Coach
 Rick Lipton as Detectives

Production

Development 
Walt Disney Pictures initially purchased rights to the series, excluing Unforgiven. By mid-2013, Disney withdrew from the project, leaving all production to Lotus Entertainment.

Pre-production 
Pre-production began in September 2013, while filimg began in February 2014 in Budapest, Hungary.  Production was completed in April 2016, but the film was two years in pre-production. Origo Film Group studios in Budapest were chosen for the film's production, work on the "angels" flight scenes and the construction of exterior areas.

Casting 
On August 16, 2013, two main characters were announced by writer Lauren Kate on their website. Addison Timlin was cast as Lucinda "Luce" Price and Jeremy Irvine would play Daniel Grigori.  On September 25, 2013 it was officially announced that Harrison Gilbertson would play Cameron "Cam" Briel, the third main character. On January 19, 2014 it was officially that Sianoa Smit-McPhee would play "Molly", the antagonist.

Filming 
After the change of producers, the producers and the director Scott Hicks settled upom Hungary as the primary location for production.  Tura Castle, stood in for the main enclosure that would conform to Sword & Cross, together with the castle Wenckheim-kastély (Szabadkígyós) also located in Hungary. Subsequent filming was set to commence in September, but was delayed until February 9, 2014 in Budapest. There were five months of filming plus two extra weeks of voice recording between the end of July and August.

Marketing and release

By the end of 2016, the trailer for Fallen leaked in the Philippines, the first country to be chosen for the premiere of the film, with low resolution and poor quality of image and sound. Lotus Entertainment re-edited the trailer, modifying small scenes and include credits at the end after the leak.

Fallen initially did not have a distribution company. Later Relativity Media, acquired the film, after several days of negotiation. The premiere took place at the Philippines.

In December 2016, the film was promoted at the Brazilian Comic-Con Experiencie in São Paulo, where Fallen had its own panel. A press conference took place with Lauren Kate (writer of Fallen) and Addison Timlin (Lucinda Price). During the event the Brazilian trailer was shown for the fans.

The film was released in the United States on September 22, 2017 by Relativity Media. It then was made available on digital platforms on September 8, 2017, and to DVD on October 10, 2017.

Reception

Critical reception 
On review aggregator Rotten Tomatoes, the film has an approval rating of 7% based on 14 reviews, with an average rating of 3.2/10.

Sequels
In December 2014, Relativity Media was announced that Torment, the second installment in the Fallen book series, was in development. It is unknown whether the last two novels, Passion and Rapture, and the spin-off novels Fallen in Love and Unforgiven, were planned to be adapted.

See also
 List of films about angels

References

External links
 
 

2010s adventure films
2016 romantic drama films
2010s romantic fantasy films
2010s teen drama films
2010s teen romance films
American fantasy adventure films
American romantic drama films
American romantic fantasy films
American teen drama films
American teen romance films
American fantasy drama films
Films based on American novels
Films based on young adult literature
Films directed by Scott Hicks
Films scored by Mark Isham
Films shot in Budapest
Hungarian drama films
Hungarian fantasy films
Hungarian romance films
Relativity Media films
Teen adventure films
2010s teen fantasy films
2010s English-language films
2010s American films
English-language Hungarian films